The Dropici were a nomadic people who lived in Iran according to Herodotus.

References 

Nomadic_groups_in_Eurasia